Hypercompe heterogena is a moth of the family Erebidae first described by Charles Oberthür in 1881. It is found in Brazil.

References

Hypercompe
Arctiinae of South America
Moths described in 1881